Widows Creek Fossil Plant (also known as the Widows Creek Power Plant) was a 1.6-gigawatt (1,600 MW) coal power plant,  east of Stevenson, Alabama, USA. The plant, operated by the Tennessee Valley Authority, generated about nine billion kilowatt-hours of electricity a year.
Along with the Chimney of the Harllee Branch Power Plant, it is the tallest chimney to be demolished in the United States.

History 
Initially, six identical 140-MWe units were built between 1952 and 1954. Two more units (575 and 550 MWe name-plate capacity) were added in 1961 and 1965.

The last load of coal was delivered to the plant on September 18, 2015, with only one of its eight generation units working. The coal was enough to power Unit 7 until September 23, 2015.

Accidents and incidents 

EPA compliance agreement 
On April 14, 2011, the U.S. Environmental Protection Agency (EPA) announced a settlement with the Tennessee Valley Authority to resolve alleged Clean Air Act violations at 11 of its coal-fired plants in Alabama, Kentucky, and Tennessee. Under the terms of the agreement, the entire Widows Creek plant was affected:
 Units 1–6 were retired in stages of two units per year, beginning by July 31, 2013 and ending by July 31, 2015
 Units 7 & 8 were to be fitted with selective catalytic reduction (SCR) devices to reduce their emissions of nitrogen oxide

Future 

On June 24, 2015, Google, a multinational technology company, announced it would invest $600 million to install a data center on land made available by the retirement of Units 1-6. A renewable power capacity equivalent to the data center's needs will be added somewhere on the TVA system, so the data center will run on renewable energy. The project broke ground in April 2018.

See also 

 List of tallest chimneys
 List of tallest freestanding structures
 List of tallest demolished freestanding structures

References

External links 
 TVA site
 Chimney Diagram
 View from Tennessee River
 

Energy infrastructure completed in 1952
Energy infrastructure completed in 1953
Energy infrastructure completed in 1954
Energy infrastructure completed in 1961
Energy infrastructure completed in 1965
Tennessee Valley Authority
Towers completed in 1977
Coal-fired power stations in Alabama
Former coal-fired power stations in the United States
Towers in Alabama
Buildings and structures in Jackson County, Alabama
Chimneys in the United States
1952 establishments in Alabama
2015 disestablishments in Alabama
Former power stations in Alabama